Tanner Robert Krebs (born 4 January 1996) is an Australian professional basketball player who last played for the Brisbane Bullets of the National Basketball League (NBL). He played college basketball for the Saint Mary's Gaels.

Early life
Krebs is the son of Dan Krebs, who played professional basketball in Australia. He attended Lake Ginninderra College and played for the Rats basketball team.

College career
Krebs redshirted his true freshman season. He struggled with his shooting as a redshirt freshman, but shot 4-of-4 from behind the arc against San Diego on 31 December 2016. On 9 December 2017, Krebs made five 3-pointers and finished with 23 points in a 97–73 win over Seattle. He posted 7.7 points and 5.2 rebounds per game as a sophomore. As a junior, Krebs averaged 8.9 points, 3.7 rebounds, and 0.8 assists per game. Krebs scored a season-high 20 points on 23 November 2019, in a 77–66 win against Lehigh. As a senior, Krebs averaged 9.1 points and 3.9 rebounds per game, shooting 39.1 percent from behind the arc.

Professional career

Brisbane Bullets (2020–2023)
On 16 July 2020, Krebs signed a two-year deal with the Brisbane Bullets of the National Basketball League.

National team career
Vasiljevic has represented Australia at several international tournaments. Krebs averaged 15.5 points, 3.7 rebounds, and 2.2 assists per game at the 2014 FIBA Under-18 Oceania Championship. At the 2015 FIBA Under-19 World Championship in Heraklion, Krebs averaged 7.9 points,  2.2 rebounds, and 1.1 assists per game. He scored 31 points in the seventh-place game, a 103–72 win over Spain.

In August 2017, he was selected to represent Australia at the Summer Universiade in Taipei. Krebs represented Australia at the  2019 Summer Universiade in Italy. He helped the team win bronze, averaging 8.8 points and 3.3 rebounds per game and scoring a personal-best 13 points against Argentina.

Career statistics

College

|-
| style="text-align:left;"| 2015–16
| style="text-align:left;"| Saint Mary's
| style="text-align:center;" colspan="11"|  Redshirt
|-
| style="text-align:left;"| 2016–17
| style="text-align:left;"| Saint Mary's
| 32 || 0 || 12.8 || .381 || .364 || .864 || 1.5 || .3 || .2 || .0 || 4.3
|-
| style="text-align:left;"| 2017–18
| style="text-align:left;"| Saint Mary's
| 36 || 29 || 27.6 || .424 || .396 || .833 || 5.2 || 1.0 || .5 || .4 || 7.7
|-
| style="text-align:left;"| 2018–19
| style="text-align:left;"| Saint Mary's
| 34 || 25 || 30.3 || .439 || .398 || .868 || 3.7 || .8 || .6 || .2 || 8.9
|-
| style="text-align:left;"| 2019–20
| style="text-align:left;"| Saint Mary's
| 33 || 33 || 30.2 || .415 || .391 || .854 || 3.9 || .8 || 1.0 || .3 || 9.1
|- class="sortbottom"
| style="text-align:center;" colspan="2"| Career
| 135 || 87 || 25.4 || .420 || .390 || .853 || 3.6 || .7 || .6 || .2 || 7.5

References

External links
Saint Mary's Gaels bio

Living people
1996 births
Australian men's basketball players
Australian expatriate basketball people in the United States
Brisbane Bullets players
People educated at Lake Ginninderra College
Saint Mary's Gaels men's basketball players
Shooting guards
Sportspeople from Hobart
Universiade medalists in basketball
Universiade bronze medalists for Australia
Medalists at the 2019 Summer Universiade